Triple Falls may refer to:
 Triple Falls (California) — a 35 ft. waterfall located at Uvas Canyon County Park
 Triple Falls (North Carolina) — a 125 ft. waterfall located in the DuPont State Forest
 Triple Falls (Oregon) — a 64 ft. waterfall located in the Oneonta Gorge
 Triple Falls - waterfalls on Englishman River, Vancouver Island, British Columbia, Canada